Article VI may refer to:

 Article VI (film), a 2008 documentary film 
 Article Six of the United States Constitution
 Article VI of the Thirty-Nine Articles – Of the sufficiency of the Holy Scriptures for Salvation